Ahmadluy, also rendered as Ahmadlu, may refer to:
 Ahmadluy-e Olya
 Ahmadluy-e Sofla